Dr. C. S. Grayson House is a historic home located at High Point, Guilford County, North Carolina. It was designed by architect Harry Barton and built between 1923 and 1925.  It is a -story, three bay, gray granite dwelling in an eclectic Colonial Revival style with American Craftsman influence.  It has a slightly flared hipped roof, porte cochere, and one-story full-facade front porch.  Also on the property is a contributing garage.

Since 1970, it has housed the Bernice Bienenstock Furniture Library, which is the world's largest specialty collection of books about the history and design of furniture, interiors, architecture, construction and more. As part of this library that is open to the public, the house hosts professional meetings, seminars, lectures and art events.

It was listed on the National Register of Historic Places in 1994.  It is located in the Uptown Suburbs Historic District.

References

Buildings and structures in High Point, North Carolina
Houses on the National Register of Historic Places in North Carolina
Colonial Revival architecture in North Carolina
Houses completed in 1925
Houses in Guilford County, North Carolina
National Register of Historic Places in Guilford County, North Carolina
Historic district contributing properties in North Carolina